Group A of the 1995 Fed Cup Europe/Africa Zone Group II was one of four pools in the Europe/Africa Zone Group II of the 1995 Fed Cup. Five teams competed in a round robin competition, with the top two teams advancing to the play-offs.

Greece vs. Norway

Tunisia vs. Egypt

Greece vs. Morocco

Norway vs. Tunisia

Greece vs. Egypt

Norway vs. Morocco

Greece vs. Tunisia

Morocco vs. Egypt

Norway vs. Egypt

Morocco vs. Tunisia

See also
Fed Cup structure

References

External links
 Fed Cup website

1995 Fed Cup Europe/Africa Zone